Yicheng is a city in northwestern Hubei, People's Republic of China. It is under the administration of Xiangyang City.

History

In 1945, in order to commemorate the anti-Japanese generals Zhang Zizhong in the Battle of Zaoyi, renamed Zizhong County, belonged to the Office of the Administrative Inspector of the Fifth District of Hubei Province. After December 1947, the area east of Hanshui was under the jurisdiction of the Chinese Communist Party (liberated zone). After July 1948, the west of Hanshui was under the jurisdiction of the Chinese Communist Party. In 1949, Yicheng County was restored and it was subordinated to the Commissioner of the Xiangyang Administrative Region of Hubei Province.

In June 1994, Yicheng County was cancelled and Yicheng City was established with the approval of the State Council.

Geography
Yicheng City is located in the northwest of Hubei Province, Hanjiang midstream. East boundary Suizhou, Zaoyang, south Zhongxiang, Jingmen, west Nanjing, north to Xiangyang. It is located at 111°57′-112°45′ east longitude and 31°26′-31°54′ north latitude. It is 76 kilometers long from east to west and 53 kilometers wide from north to south, with a total area of 2115 square kilometers.

Climate

Administration
Yicheng administers 2 subdistricts, 8 towns, and 3 other township-level divisions.

Two subdistricts:
Yancheng Subdistrict, Nanying Subdistrict

Eight towns:
Zhengji, Xiaohe, Liuhou, Kongwan, Liushui, Banqiao (or Banqiaodian ), Wangji, Leihe

Three other areas:
Yicheng Economic Development Zone, Dayan Industrial Park, Re-education Through Labor camp

Demographics
At the end of 2006, the city's total population was 564,500, of which the urban population was 226,600, the rural population was 335,900, the annual birth population was 4,770, the birth rate was 8.45 ‰; the death toll was 3,278, the mortality rate was 5.81 ‰; the natural growth rate was 2.64 ‰.

Historical Figures
Songyu, Xianglang, Xiangpang, Maliang, MaWei, Zhongliang, Wangning, Zhou Renshou, Lu Guiyuan, Wang Wanfang, Duancheng, Wang Yi, Zhang Zizhong

References

County-level divisions of Hubei